The Suburban Mobility Authority for Regional Transportation (SMART) is the public transit operator serving the suburbs of Detroit, Michigan, United States. It supplements the Detroit Department of Transportation, which operates buses within the city of Detroit. Beginning operations in 1967 as the Southeastern Michigan Transportation Authority (SEMTA), the agency was reorganized and renamed SMART in 1989. SMART operates 47 bus routes, plus paratransit and microtransit services, covering select communities in Wayne , plus all of Macomb County and Oakland County.

As of 2008, SMART has the third-highest ridership of Michigan's transit systems, surpassed by Lansing's Capital Area Transportation Authority and the Detroit Department of Transportation.

History

1967–1989: SEMTA 

The Michigan Legislature passed the Metropolitan Transportation Authorities Act of 1967, which included the creation of Southeastern Michigan Transportation Authority (SEMTA). SEMTA was charged to take over the ownership and operations of the fractured regional transit systems in Macomb, Oakland, and Wayne counties, including the city of Detroit.

The new authority acquired several suburban transit bus operations including Lake Shore Coach Lines (1971), Pontiac Municipal Transit Service (1973), Dearborn's Metropolitan Transit (1974), Birmingham's Great Lakes Transit (1974), and Royak Oak's Martin Lines (1975). However, the 1967 transportation act did not provide the regional authority with any means to levy taxes. By 1974, the Detroit Department of Street Railways (DSR) had been reorganized as a city department of Detroit, leaving SEMTA only coordination over the suburban services.  That same year, SEMTA acquired a commuter train service between downtown Detroit and Pontiac from the Grand Trunk Western Railroad. Due to declining ridership and a lack of funding, the commuter rail service was discontinued in October 1983.

In 1979, SEMTA approved a regional transit plan, which included improved bus service and new rail transit, but the plan was never implemented due to lack of funds.  The last commuter rail service was a former Penn Central route, named the Michigan Executive, that ran from the Michigan Central Depot in Detroit to Jackson. Its final operator was Amtrak, as funded by the State of Michigan. The already pared down Executive service ended in 1984.

Beginning in 1983, SEMTA oversaw the construction of the Detroit People Mover, which was conceived as part of a much larger project of light rail lines and a downtown subway.  Mismanagement of the project resulted in tens of millions of dollars in cost overruns, causing the federal government to pull out of the project.  In 1985, with the half-built project in limbo, the city of Detroit negotiated with SEMTA to take over the project, and it was transferred to the newly created Detroit Transportation Corporation.

1989–2009: Reorganization as SMART, opt-out system 

With little interest in the suburbs for expanding mass transit and Detroit not interested in joining the system, SEMTA was restructured as SMART in 1989, reducing the authority's service area from seven counties to three and excluding the city of Detroit.

In 2005, Livonia opted out of SMART, as the first, and so far only, community to leave the system since 1995. Walled Lake rejoined SMART the following year.

On December 1, 2009, SMART raised its fares by $0.50. There was also a $0.50 charge added to regional monthly pass users and DDOT transfers.  Fare increases were made to prevent possible cuts in bus services.

2011–2017: Service cuts 
In October 2011, the authority cut 22% of its service and laid off 123 employees due to declining property values which fund the system through its millage, and the inability of the authority to reach an agreement with its unions.

In January 2012, the Farmington City Council voted 4-1 to opt out of SMART, though they unanimously reversed their decision two weeks later. Neighboring Farmington Hills narrowly voted to remain in the system.

Lathrup Village, which had opted out of SMART in 1995, rejoined the system in 2014.

2018–present: Expansion, integration, and rebranding 
On January 1, 2018, SMART began operating three high frequency, limited-stop FAST bus services, connecting downtown Detroit to suburban communities with frequent service. FAST represented the first major expansion of the system since the 2011 service cuts.

In May 2019, SMART and DDOT unified their fare structures and introduced Dart, a common fare payment system. The QLINE joined Dart the following October.

In March 2021, SMART began offering Flex, a microtransit service, in three small zones within SMART's service area, with one covering Dearborn and most of Taylor alongside portions of surrounding communities, another serving portions of Troy and surrounding cities, and the third serving communities along M-59 in Macomb County. Two more zones were added in December 2021 and May 2022, covering Auburn Hills and Pontiac, and Farmington and Farmington Hills, respectively.

In February 2022, the Auburn Hills City Council voted 5-2 to opt out of SMART. The city's exit was blocked by a judge in May, and Auburn Hills remains a member as of December 2022.

2022 saw a renewed push for a countywide expansion of SMART in Oakland County, ahead of the scheduled millage renewal that August. The Oakland County Board of Commissioners proposed replacing the existing SMART millage with a new ten-year .95 millage, which would be levied on all homes in the county, not just in existing member communities. Approved by voters in November 2022, the millage abolished opt-out system in Oakland County, allowing for the expansion of SMART services to the far reaches of Metro Detroit. Work is underway for new routes to begin operations in 2023.

SMART unveiled a new logo and branding in August 2022, coinciding with a new advertising campaign. The following month, SMART introduced their first electric bus, one of four Proterra ZX5 units purchased by the agency with a Federal Transit Administration grant.

Opt-out system 
SMART is notable among US transit systems for the ability of individual communities to "opt out" of the system. Opted-out communities are not subject to the taxes levied by the SMART millage, but as a result do not receive SMART's services. Some of these communities are members of smaller transit agencies providing paratransit services for seniors and disabled residents, but lack scheduled bus service.

17 communities in Wayne County currently opt out of SMART service, of which all but one (Livonia) opted out with the first millage in 1995. Detroit is one such community, as its own DDOT provides fixed-route bus service to the city, though it is served by SMART's FAST limited-stop routes, as well as other routes during peak hours.

Communities in Macomb County and Oakland County are not able to opt out of SMART, as the millage has been levied countywide there since 1995 and 2023, respectively. Four Oakland County communities opted out in 1995 but later rejoined: Bloomfield Township and West Bloomfield (both 1996), Walled Lake (2006), and Lathrup Village (2014). 34 other Oakland County communities were added to the system following the 2023 millage.

Millage 
Since 1995, SMART has been funded in large part by a millage, renewed by voters in member communities every four years, appearing on the August primary ballot in midterm election years through 2018. The millage has historically been approved by wide margins in every member community in Oakland and Wayne counties, though less so in Macomb County, passing there by a narrow margin of 39 votes in 2018.

2022 changes & Oakland County expansion 
In 2022, the SMART millage in Macomb and Wayne counties was extended to five years, and moved to the November general election ballot. Both were approved by wide margins.

In Oakland County, the SMART millage was replaced with a ten-year millage levied countywide, which will abolish the opt-out system in Oakland County, and fund three smaller paratransit providers (the North Oakland Transportation Authority, Western Oakland Transportation Authority, and Older Persons' Commission) alongside SMART. The county's Board of Commissioners approved the new millage proposal on August 10, 2022 in a bipartisan vote, with two Republicans joining all 13 Democrats on the board. The proposal appeared on the November 2022 general election ballot in all Oakland County communities, and passed with 57% of the vote. As a result, SMART's service area expanded to all of Oakland County on January 3, 2023, though new services in those areas have not yet begun operation.

Wayne County member communities 

 Allen Park
 Dearborn
 Dearborn Heights
 Ecorse
 Garden City
 Grosse Pointe
 Grosse Pointe Farms
 Grosse Pointe Park
 Grosse Pointe Shores
 Grosse Pointe Woods
 Hamtramck
 Harper Woods
 Highland Park
 Inkster
 Lincoln Park
 Melvindale
 Redford
 River Rouge
 Riverview
 Romulus
 Southgate
 Taylor
 Trenton
 Wayne
 Westland
 Wyandotte

Services

Fixed route buses 
SMART operates 47 fixed bus routes across its service area, serving as the main transit connection between Detroit's suburbs. Most SMART routes run hourly, though some run every 30–40 minutes.

Fixed routes are operated with a fleet of 262 buses, consisting mostly of 40-foot Gillig BRT units, plus some articulated New Flyer Xcelsior and electric Proterra ZX5 buses.

Some of SMART's routes enter the City of Detroit and serve the Downtown and Midtown cores during weekday rush hours. Elsewhere in Detroit city limits, a local ordinance bars passengers from being dropped off on outbound routes, or boarding on inbound routes.  This is intended to avoid service duplication with Detroit Department of Transportation, which supplements the city of Detroit with its own bus service.

FAST 
FAST (Frequent Affordable Safe Transit) limited-stop routes run along major Metro Detroit corridors, connecting downtown and midtown Detroit to suburban communities and Detroit Metro Airport with frequent service. Launched on January 1, 2018, FAST routes offer service along Michigan Avenue, Woodward Avenue, and Gratiot Avenue.

List of current fixed routes



FAST 
FAST (Frequent Affordable Safe Transit) limited-stop routes run along major Metro Detroit corridors, connecting downtown and midtown Detroit to suburban communities and Detroit Metro Airport with frequent service. Launched on January 1, 2018, FAST routes offer service along Michigan Avenue, Woodward Avenue, and Gratiot Avenue.

Flex 
Flex is an on-demand microtransit service operated by Via Transportation, intended as a last-mile service to connect fixed route riders to their final destinations. The service operates similar to ridesharing; a passenger books a ride via telephone through the Flex app, and a marked vehicle (usually a minivan) picks them up (within 30 minutes) and takes them to their destination. Flex was launched in March 2021, and currently operates in five service zones, covering all or part of 20 SMART member communities.
The fleet used for Flex consists mostly of Chrysler Pacifica, Dodge Grand Caravan, and Toyota Sienna minivans, owned by Avis Budget Group. Each vehicle seats three or four Flex passengers, and some are equipped to transport wheelchairs.

Connector 
Connector is a paratransit service available across the SMART service area. It is available to residents of all ages, provided they live more than 1/3 of a mile away from a fixed route, though the distance requirement is waived for seniors (65 or older) and disabled riders. Connector service requires a reservation made by telephone at least one day in advance, and is operated using a fleet of Champion Challenger minibuses.

Community Transit 
Community Transit is a paratransit service, available only to seniors and disabled riders. Unlike Connector, which is operated directly by SMART, Community Transit is operated by the municipal governments of member communities, as well as some nonprofit organizations.

Community Transit is operated with a fleet of Champion and ElDorado minibuses, and Ford E-Series and Transit vans.

Fleet 
Current fixed-route fleet

Fares

Since 2019, SMART, DDOT, and the QLINE have had a unified fare payment system, Dart. Dart passes are available as digital passes through the Dart app, or as physical passes, which can be purchased from SMART's ticket offices in downtown Detroit and Royal Oak, the Rosa Parks Transit Center, SMART's online store, and select local businesses.

A single ride on a fixed-route bus costs US$2, which, when paid with cash, includes a printed four-hour pass upon request from the driver. Reduced fares are available, with a single ride costing 50¢ for riders aged 6–18 or 65 and older, and disabled riders. Discounted Dart passes are also available for these riders.

A 50¢ surcharge applies when riding SMART's park-and-ride (800-series) routes, regardless of fare type or pass.

Flex fares are distance-based, ranging from $2 to $8, and paid through the Flex app with a major credit or debit card. Flex also accepts SMART transfers and DART passes.

Governance 
SMART has its headquarters in the Buhl Building in downtown Detroit. It is governed by a seven-member Board of Directors, consisting of two members each from Wayne, Oakland and Macomb Counties, and one from Monroe County.

Board of Directors members 
Wayne County
 Abdul Haidous, Wayne County Commissioner
 Khalil Rahal, Assistant County Executive
Oakland County
 Hilarie Chambers, Chief Deputy County Executive
 Bret C. Rasegan, Planning Manager
Macomb County
 Vicki Wolber, Deputy County Executive
 John Paul Rea, Deputy County Executive
Monroe County
 Royce Maniko, former Chief Finance Officer

References

External links

 SMART website
 Transportation Riders United

Intermodal transportation authorities in Michigan
Metro Detroit
Transit agencies in the United States
Bus transportation in Michigan
Paratransit services in the United States
Public transportation in Michigan
Transportation in Detroit
Transportation in Oakland County, Michigan
Transportation in Wayne County, Michigan
Transportation in Macomb County, Michigan
Economy of Detroit
Economy of Metro Detroit
Government agencies established in 1967
1967 establishments in Michigan